Tavleen Singh (born 1950) is an Indian columnist, political reporter and writer.

Biography
Singh was born in Mussoorie in 1950 in a Jat Sikh family. She studied at the Welham Girls School. She did a short-term Journalism course from the New Delhi Polytechnic in 1969. 
She graduated from St. Bede's College, Shimla.

She completed her education in India and started her career with a reporting job at the Evening Mail, Slough (England), where she worked and trained for two and a half years under the Westminster Press/Thompson training scheme.

Singh returned to India in 1974 to work with The Statesman as a reporter. She joined The Telegraph as a Special Correspondent in 1982. In 1985 and also in 1987 she became the South Asia correspondent of the Sunday Times, London.

Subsequently, she became a freelancer and started writing for India Today and The Indian Express.

In 1990 she began her stint with television by heading Plus Channel's Delhi bureau. Singh presented two video magazines called People Plus and Business Plus. She has done Ek Din Ek Jeevan, a Hindi weekly programme for STAR Plus.

, she is with The Indian Express and The Hitavada. She writes a weekly column for them, on Sundays. In 1988, she was honoured with the Chameli Devi Jain Award for Outstanding Women Mediaperson.

Personal life
Singh has a son, writer Aatish Taseer, with former Pakistani politician Salman Taseer.

Works
 Kashmir: A Tragedy of Errors. Viking, 1995. .
 Lollipop Street: Why India Will Survive Her Politicians.  Viking, 1999. .
 Fifth Column. Viking, .
 Political and Incorrect: The real India, warts and all . Harpercollins. 2008. .
 Durbar. Hachette, 2012. .
 India's Broken Tryst. Harpercollins, 2016. 
 Messiah Modi: A Tale of Great Expectations, 2020

References

External links

 Tavleen Singh's official website

1950 births
Living people
Indian columnists
Indian women television journalists
Indian television journalists
Indian political journalists
Indian political writers
Indian women television presenters
Indian television presenters
Writers from Dehradun
Indian women political writers
20th-century Indian women writers
Indian women columnists
Journalists from Uttarakhand
English-language writers from India
21st-century Indian women writers
20th-century Indian journalists
21st-century Indian journalists
People from Mussoorie
Indian Sikhs
Women writers from Uttarakhand
Welham Girls' School alumni